François Édouard Bertin (1797–1871) was a French painter born in Paris, and the son of the renowned journalist Louis-François Bertin. Édouard studied under Girodet-Trioson and Bidauld. He represented the details and general character of a landscape with great skill, but was less successful in his colouring. He was inspector of the Beaux Arts, and from 1854, was the director of the Journal des Débats. Bertin died in Paris in 1871.

Selected works

Cimabue meeting with Giotto.
Christ on the Mount of Olives. 1837.
A view of Olevano.
The old Tombs on the Nile.
The Forest of Fontainebleau.
View of an excavated Monastery near Viterbo.

References
 

19th-century French painters
French male painters
1797 births
1871 deaths
Painters from Paris
19th-century French male artists
18th-century French male artists